The Mount Ingino Christmas Tree is a lighting illumination in the shape of a Christmas tree that is installed annually on the slopes of Mount Ingino (Monte Ingino in Italian) outside the city of Gubbio, in the Umbria region in Italy. The tree is also called the Gubbio Christmas Tree or the biggest Christmas tree in the world. In 1991 the Guinness Book of Records named it "The World's Largest Christmas Tree".

History
The illumination can be seen up to 50 kilometres (30 miles) away.

This tradition started when people of Gubbio decided to celebrate Christmas in a different way and in 1981 the first tree was illuminated. Each year, on the eve of the feast of the Immaculate Conception (December 7), the Christmas tree is lit up. Since then the tradition is repeated annually thanks to a special committee consisting of volunteers giving up their free time for about three months every year. 

Since 2010 electricity for the Christmas tree lights is generated by the photovoltaic system.

In 2011 the lights were switched on remotely by Pope Benedict XVI using a tablet computer. The Pope spoke via video link to the people of Gubbio from his papal apartment in Vatican.

In 2013, the holiday display used 1,000 lights and stretched more than 1,000 square meters or 10, 760 square feet.

In 2013, Don Francesco Soddu, Director of Italian CARITAS led the lighting ceremony. This was a tribute to the contribution of volunteers in times of emergencies in Italian communities.

In 2014 the lights were switched on remotely by Pope Francis using a tablet computer.

See also
Basilica of Sant'Ubaldo, Gubbio

References

External links
 Official page of the Largest Christmas Tree in the World Committee
 view on the Christmas Tree for photographers
 Lighting of the Christmas Tree

Individual Christmas trees
Buildings and structures in Gubbio
1981 establishments in Italy
Tourist attractions in Umbria
Christmas in Italy
Individual trees in Italy